L'Aigle station (French: Gare de L'Aigle) is a railway station serving the town L'Aigle, Orne department, northwestern France.

Services

The station is served by regional trains to Argentan, Paris and Granville.

References

Railway stations in Orne
Railway stations in France opened in 1866